The 2019 FIA Formula 3 Championship was the inaugural season of the FIA Formula 3 Championship, a multi-event motor racing championship for single-seat open-wheel formula racing cars. The championship featured drivers competing in 3.4-litre Formula 3 racing cars which conform to the technical regulations, or formula, of the championship. It ran in support of the Formula 1 World Championship and its sister series, the FIA Formula 2 Championship. It serves as the third tier of formula racing in the FIA Global Pathway. The championship was formed by the merger of the GP3 Series and the FIA Formula 3 European Championship in 2018, which brought the two championships under the umbrella of the Fédération Internationale de l'Automobile (FIA). The Formula One theme song composed by Brian Tyler, which debuted in the 2018 F1 season, would be used in Formula 3 broadcasts.

Prema Racing driver Robert Shwartzman won the championship title with one race to spare after collecting three race wins with six other podium finishes. Shwartzman dominated from the first race of the season, losing the drivers' championship lead only for one race to his teammate Jehan Daruvala. Daruvala, who finished third overall, was victorious at Barcelona and Le Castellet. Marcus Armstrong, another Prema driver, finished second and won races at Hungaroring, Spa and Sochi. He passed Daruvala by one point in the drivers' championship just in the final race of the season. Prema Racing became the inaugural teams' champions after the second Spa-Francorchamps race.

Teams and drivers
The following teams and drivers competed in the 2019 championship. As the championship is a spec series, all teams competed with an identical Dallara F3 2019 chassis and a bespoke tyre compound developed by Pirelli. Each car was powered by a  naturally-aspirated V6 engine developed by Mecachrome that was previously used in the Dallara GP3/16. Teams were required to enter three cars.

Team entries
The merging of the GP3 Series and the FIA Formula 3 European Championship saw the FIA open up a tender process to prospective entrants. ART Grand Prix, Campos Racing, Jenzer Motorsport, MP Motorsport and Trident were selected from the GP3 Series entrants, while Carlin, Hitech Grand Prix and Prema Racing were chosen from the Formula 3 European Championship. Both Carlin and Prema Racing held entries in the championship's sister series Formula 2, as did Charouz Racing System. Charouz later formed a partnership with Sauber Motorsport, which currently runs Alfa Romeo's team in Formula 1. The final entry was awarded to HWA Racelab, who joined the series after Mercedes-Benz withdrew from the Deutsche Tourenwagen Masters touring car championship. Formula 2 and GP3 regulars Arden International decided against entering Formula 3, while Motopark—who competed in the Formula 3 European Championship—were unsuccessful in their application and instead entered the Japanese Super Formula Championship.

Driver entries
Teppei Natori, who placed second in the 2018 F4 Japanese Championship, joined the series with Carlin Buzz Racing along with Euroformula Open champion Felipe Drugovich and Eurocup Formula Renault race winner Logan Sargeant. FIA Formula 3 European Championship race winners and Ferrari juniors Marcus Armstrong and Robert Shwartzman continued their collaboration with Prema Racing into the championship. Jehan Daruvala, who raced in Formula 3 European Championship with Carlin, also joined Prema Racing.

Honda promoted F4 Japanese champion and Red Bull Junior, Yuki Tsunoda to the category with Jenzer Motorsport. Artem Petrov joined the team from the Formula 3 European Championship and Andreas Estner from ADAC Formula 4. Red Bull Junior Jüri Vips, who also raced in the Formula 3 European Championship, moved to the new championship with Hitech Grand Prix. Leonardo Pulcini and Ye Yifei, who raced in GP3 with Campos Racing and Formula Renault with Josef Kaufmann Racing respectively, also joined Hitech Grand Prix.

After racing in the GP3 Series with Jenzer Motorsport and Trident, David Beckmann signed with ART Grand Prix, who also took on Renault Sport Academy members Max Fewtrell and Christian Lundgaard. Sebastián Fernández, Alex Peroni and Alessio Deledda joined Campos Racing after competing in the FIA European Formula 3 Championship with Motopark, Formula Renault Eurocup with MP Motorsport and Italian F4 with Technorace respectively.

Keyvan Andres Soori, who raced in European Formula 3 with Van Amersfoort Racing, joined the championship with HWA Racelab. He was partnered with Bent Viscaal, who was the runner-up in the 2018 Euroformula Open Championship driving for Teo Martín Motorsport, and Jake Hughes, who raced in GP3 with ART. After racing with them in GP3, Richard Verschoor joined MP Motorsport alongside Simo Laaksonen and reigning TRS champion and Red Bull Junior, Liam Lawson.

The Sauber Junior Team by Charouz entered the championship fielding reigning ADAC Formula 4 champion Lirim Zendeli, European Formula 3 racer Fabio Scherer and reigning F3 Asian champion Raoul Hyman. After scoring two race wins with them in the 2018 GP3 Series, Pedro Piquet reunited with Trident and was joined by Niko Kari and Devlin DeFrancesco, both of whom switched from MP Motorsport.

Mid-season changes
Artem Petrov ended his campaign after the first round due to lack of funding. His replacement at Jenzer Motorsport was Giorgio Carrara, however the Argentine could only start participating from the Spielberg round due to visa issues. Carrara was replaced with Federico Malvestiti for the Silverstone round. Carrara returned to the seat in Hungary. Hon Chio Leong replaced Carrara for the season finale at Sochi Autodrom.

Following an accident at the Monza round that left him with fractured vertebrae, Alex Peroni missed the final round at Sochi. He was replaced with David Schumacher, son of Ralf.

David Beckmann withdrew from the final round of the championship for personal reasons.

Calendar
A schedule of eight rounds was made to take place as part of the 2019 championship. The eight rounds were drawn from the 2018 GP3 Series calendar as the series was run on the Formula 1 support bill whereas the Formula 3 European Championship did not. The ninth round held at the Yas Marina Circuit in 2018 was omitted from the Formula 3 calendar to allow drivers the opportunity to compete in the 2019 Macau Grand Prix, which was announced during the season to be a non-championship round of the FIA Formula 3 Championship, as all teams and cars were at the event.

Regulation changes

The car
For the championship's inaugural season, all teams were supplied with a new chassis package, named the Dallara F3 2019. It was still powered by a fuel-efficient 3.4 litre (207 cu in) naturally-aspirated direct-injected V6 engine developed by Mecachrome that also powered the GP3/16 chassis which was used in the championship's predecessor, the GP3 Series from 2016 to 2018. The chassis used tyres supplied by Pirelli and also featured the "halo" cockpit protection device used in the championship's sister series Formula One and Formula 2.

Technical regulations
The championship introduced a rule restricting the amount of downforce available during a race. Teams were free to run as much downforce as they choose during free practice and qualifying in order to find the ideal car setup, but the minimum and maximum allowable angle of the rear wing was specified by stewards ahead of the race.

Use of the Drag Reduction System (DRS) was unrestricted, whereas the championship's predecessor, GP3, restricted its use to six in the feature race and four in the sprint race.

Season report

Round 1: Spain

For the first race of the season it was Robert Shwartzman who took pole with Christian Lundgaard second.

Results

Season summary

Championship standings

Scoring system
Points were awarded to the top 10 classified finishers in Race 1, and to the top 8 classified finishers in Race 2. The pole-sitter in Race 1 received four points, and two points were given to the driver who set the fastest lap inside the top ten in both races. No extra points are awarded to the pole-sitter in Race 2 as the grid for Race 2 is based on the results of Race 1 with the top eight drivers having their positions reversed.

Race 1 points

Race 2 points
Points were awarded to the top eight classified finishers, excluding the fastest lap points which are given to the top ten classified finishers.

Drivers' championship

Notes:
 – Drivers did not finish the race, but were classified as they completed more than 90% of the race distance.

Teams' championship

Notes:
 – Drivers did not finish the race, but were classified as they completed more than 90% of the race distance.

Notes

References

External links

 
2019

FIA Formula 3 Championship
Formula 3